Finnish national road 12 is a highway in Finland between Rauma and Kouvola via Huittinen, Tampere and Lahti. It is known as Teiskontie to the east of the Tampere urban area.

Route
The route of the road is: Rauma – Eura – Köyliö – Kokemäki – Huittinen – Sastamala – Nokia – Tampere – Kangasala – Pälkäne – Hämeenlinna – Hämeenkoski – Hollola – Lahti – Nastola – Orimattila – Nastola (again) – Iitti – Kouvola.

See also
 Paasikiven–Kekkosentie
 Tampere Tunnel

External links

Roads in Finland
Transport in Tampere